I Nicotera is a 1972 Italian drama television miniseries directed by Salvatore Nocita and starring Turi Ferro. A story of ordinary discomfort of a Sicilian family immigrated to North Italy, the miniseries got large critical acclaim.

Cast
 
Turi Ferro as  Salvatore Nicotera  
 Bruno Cirino as   Gianni Nicotera  
Gabriele Lavia as  Luciano Nicotera 
 Micaela Esdra as   Anna Nicotera 
Francesca De Seta as   Patrizia Nicotera 
Nella Bartoli as   Cettina Nicotera  
Nicoletta Rizzi as   Marisa Nicotera 
Bruno Cattaneo as   Mario 
Daria Nicolodi as  Alessandra  
Antonio Casagrande as   Osvaldo 
 Donatina Furlone as   Roberta 
Paolo Modugno as   Federico
Claudio Cassinelli as   Psychologist
 Pietro Calderini as   Il Piana
  Livia Cerini  as  Livia
Ernesto Colli as Giacomo  
Giampiero Albertini as  Il Giacovazzo
Isabella Riva as  Mario's Grandma
Adriana Asti as  Marilù  
Gigi Ballista as  Pirovano  
Carlo Bagno as  Il Pigna
Claudio Gora as   Alessandra's Father

References

External links
 

1972 television films
1972 films
Italian television films
Films directed by Salvatore Nocita
Films scored by Ennio Morricone
Films about internal migration
1970s Italian films